Deh Sufian (also Romanized as Deh Şūfīān and Deh Sūfīyān) is a village in Poshtkuh Rural District, Shahmirzad District, Mehdishahr County, Semnan Province, Iran. At the 2006 census, its population was 24, in 9 families.

References 

Populated places in Mehdishahr County